ASanambut is a village panchayat of 27 km² area in a panchayat union (Vellore Taluk, Vellore district, Tamil Nadu, India. It has a population of 5000 people. Under its governance are three villages – Asanambut, Kallaraparai, and Kuruvankottai. This village is in the foothills of the Javadi Hills and is very close to the Palar river.

References

Villages in Vellore district